is a Japanese politician serving in the House of Representatives in the Diet (national legislature) as a member of the Liberal Democratic Party. A native of Wakayama, Wakayama and graduate of the University of Tokyo, he was elected for the first time in 2005 after working as a bartender and an aide to Representative Toshihiro Nikai, and serving in the Wakayama Prefectural Assembly.

References

External links 
  in Japanese.

1966 births
Living people
Bartenders
Members of the Wakayama Prefectural Assembly
Liberal Democratic Party (Japan) politicians
Members of the House of Representatives (Japan)
People from Wakayama (city)
University of Tokyo alumni
21st-century Japanese politicians